White Matlack (October 7, 1745; Haddonfield, New Jersey – January 7, 1824) to Elizabeth Martha Burr Haines and Timothy Matlack: a couple that had both lost their first spouses. His grandparents were William Matlack and Mary Hancock; and Henry Burr and Elizabeth Hudson. His siblings were Sybil, Elizabeth, Titus, Seth, Josiah and Timothy Matlack. He was a New York Quaker and abolitionist.

He married Mary Hawhurst on March 6, 1768. They had four children; White, Timothy, Mary, and Hannah.

White was a watchmaker and silversmith in New York City from around 1769 to 1775. In 1775, he also worked in Philadelphia. Then he ran a brewery located not far from the Fraunces Tavern. By the 1780s he moved into steel manufacturing.

In 1782, he and Isaac Howell signed a document titled The memorial and remonstrance of Isaac Howell and White Matlack, in behalf of themselves, and others, who have been disowned by the people called Quakers, &c. White and his brother Timothy had been disowned by Orthodox Quakers for their support of the American Revolution. They formed a group with others called the Society of Free Quakers.

In 1786, he signed a letter to the Senate and assembly of the State of New York, against the shipping of African slaves through the port of New York.

Three years later he became a member of the New York Manumission Society. In 1787, the society founded the African Free School.

He died at Bay Side, near Flushing on Long Island, aged 80.

References

External links

1745 births
1824 deaths
American Quakers
American abolitionists
18th-century Quakers
19th-century Quakers
American watchmakers (people)
American silversmiths
Quaker abolitionists
People from Haddonfield, New Jersey
People from Flushing, Queens
People of colonial New Jersey
People of the Province of New York
People of New Jersey in the American Revolution
Members of the New York Manumission Society